Phaeocryptopus gaeumannii is a fungus that infects Douglas fir and causes Swiss needle cast, a yellowing of foliage and reduction in growth. It is endemic in western North American stands of Douglas fir, but was first discovered in Douglas fir trees planted Switzerland. When trees in America were checked, it was found that the fungus was common but apparently caused no disease. However, in the 1980s and 90s the disease became noticeable and problematic.

The classification of Phaeocryptopus gaeumannii within the Venturiaceae has been questioned, with molecular studies placing it in the Mycosphaerellaceae (Capnodiales), close to species of Mycosphaerella and Rasutoria, such as Rasutoria pseudotsugae and Rasutoria tsugae.

The fungus infects trees in the spring, and continues to develop over the following winter. The fungus causes yellowing (chlorosis) of the needles, with eventual necrosis and premature needle-drop. In some heavily diseased stands of trees, the only needles remaining are those of the current year, in which the disease has not yet had time to fully develop. The overall result for the infected tree is reduced growth.

The fungus is temperature dependent within the Douglas fir range, with the highest level of infection in the warmest part of the range.  Growth reduction in the warm part of the range averages 35%.

Gallery

References

External links 
 

Venturiaceae
Fungal conifer pathogens and diseases
Fungi described in 1936
Fungi of Europe
Fungi of North America